Lochmaeocles consobrinus is a species of beetle in the family Cerambycidae. It was described by Dillon and Dillon in 1946.

Subspecies
 Lochmaeocles consobrinus bolivianus Dillon & Dillon, 1946
 Lochmaeocles consobrinus consobrinus Dillon & Dillon, 1946

References

consobrinus
Beetles described in 1946